Eupitheciini is a tribe of geometer moths under subfamily Larentiinae, often referred to as pugs. The tribe was described by Tutt in 1896.

Diversity
The tribe consists of about 47 genera, 15 of which are monotypic.

Recognized genera
 Aepylopha Turner, 1942
 Antimimistis Turner, 1922
 Ardonis Moore, 1888
 Axinoptera Hampson, 1893
 Bosara Walker, 1866
 Calluga Moore, [1887]
 Carbia Walker, 1866
 Casuariclystis Holloway, 1997
 Celaenaclystis Holloway, 1997
 Chloroclystis Hübner, [1825]
 Chrysoclystis Warren, 1896
 Dasimatia Warren, 1898
 Dissolophodes Warren, 1907
 Eupithecia Curtis, 1825
 Eupithystis Holloway, 1997
 Eriopithex Warren, 1896
 Eva Vojnits, 1981
 Girida Mironov & Galsworthy, 2012
 Glaucoclystis Holloway, 1997
 Gymnoscelis Mabille, 1868
 Hybridoneura Warren, 1898
 Mariaba Walker, 1866
 Mesocolpia Warren, 1901
 Mesoptila Meyrick, 1891
 Microdes  Guenée, 1857
 Micromia Warren, 1906
 Micrulia Warren, 1896
 Mnesiloba Warren, 1901
 Nasusina Pearsall, 1908
 Onagrodes Warren, 1896
 Otucha Warren, 1907
 Pareupithecia Mironov & Galsworthy, 2012
 Pasiphila Warren, 1895
 Pasiphilodes Warren, 1895
 Phrissogonus Butler, 1882
 Polysphalia Warren, 1906
 Pomasia Guenee, 1857
 Prorella Barnes & McDunnough, 1918
 Pseudopolynesia Holloway, 1997
 Ptychotheca Warren, 1906
 Pycnoloma Warren, 1906
 Rhinoprora Warren, 1895
 Scintillithex Holloway, 1997
 Sigilliclystis Galsworthy, 1999
 Spiralisigna Holloway, 1997
 Symmimetis Turner, 1907
 Syncosmia Warren, 1897
 Tripteridia Warren, 1903
 Ziridava Walker, 1863

Former genera
 Collix Guenée in Boisduval & Guenée, 1857 (now in Melanthiini)
 Eois Hübner, 1818 (now in Asthenini)
 Parasthena Warren, 1902 (now in Asthenini)
 Poecilasthena Warren, 1894 (now in Asthenini)
 Polynesia Swinhoe, 1892 (now in Asthenini)
 Pseudocollix Warren, 1895 (now in Melanthiini)

References

  (1999). "New and revised eupitheciine species (Geometridae, Larentiinae) from Hong Kong and South East Asia". Transactions of the Lepidopterological Society of Japan. 50 (3): 223-234.
  (2002). "Bosara Walker: revisional notes on the Bosara refusaria group of species (Geometridae: Larentiinae)". Transactions of the Lepidopterological Society of Japan. 54 (3): 147-155.
  (1996). "Chloroclystis v-ata relicta ssp. n. (Lepidoptera: Geometridae), a new taxon from SW Finland, doomed to go extinct?" Entomologica Fennica. 7 (2): 63-66.
  (2011). "A morphological review of tribes in Larentiinae (Lepidoptera: Geometridae)". Zootaxa. 3136: 1–44.

 
Larentiinae